The 2003 Pacific Life Open was a tennis tournament played on outdoor hard courts. It was the 30th edition of the Indian Wells Masters and was part of the Tennis Masters Series of the 2003 ATP Tour and of Tier I of the 2003 WTA Tour. Both the men's and women's events took place at the Indian Wells Tennis Garden in Indian Wells, California in the United States from March 5 through March 16, 2003.

Champions

Men's singles

 Lleyton Hewitt defeated  Gustavo Kuerten, 6–1, 6–1
 It was Hewitt's 2nd title of the year and the 21st of his career. It was his 1st Masters title of the year and his 2nd overall. It was also his 2nd title at the event after winning in 2002.

Women's singles

 Kim Clijsters defeated  Lindsay Davenport 6–4, 7–5
 It was Clijsters' 4th title of the year and the 19th of her career. It was her 1st Tier I title.

Men's doubles

 Wayne Ferreira /  Yevgeny Kafelnikov defeated  Bob Bryan /  Mike Bryan 3–6, 7–5, 6–4
 It was Ferreira's 1st title of the year and the 25th of his career. It was Kafelnikov's 1st title of the year and the 52nd of his career.

Women's doubles

 Lindsay Davenport /  Lisa Raymond defeated  Kim Clijsters /  Ai Sugiyama 3–6, 6–4, 6–1
 It was Davenport's 2nd title of the year and the 72nd of her career. It was Raymond's 2nd title of the year and the 43rd of her career.

References

External links
 
 Association of Tennis Professionals (ATP) tournament profile
 WTA Tournament Profile

 
Pacific Life Open
Pacific Life Open
2003
Pacific Life Open
Pacific Life Open
Pacific Life Open